Michael Lentz (born 1964) is a German author, musician, and performer of experimental texts and sound poetry.

Life
Lentz was born in Düren. His father  (1927–2014) was city manager of Düren. He completed his PhD in 1999; the thesis was titled Lautpoesie, -musik nach 1945. Lentz was student of Josef Anton Riedl and saxophonist in Riedl's Ensemble.
He was the winner of the 2001 Ingeborg Bachmann Prize for his book .
In May 2006 he was appointed professor for literary writing at the German Literature Institute, University of Leipzig. The genres of his work are poems, plays, radio plays, short stories and novels.

Lentz lives in Munich.

Awards
 2001  Ingeborg Bachmann Prize for Muttersterben
 2005 Preis der Literaturhäuser
 2012

Memberships
 2014 Deutsche Akademie für Sprache und Dichtung, Darmstadt

Works

Thesis

References

External links

 

1964 births
Living people
Ingeborg Bachmann Prize winners
German-language poets
German male poets